WJDQ (101.3 FM, "Q101") is a Top 40 (CHR) formatted radio station in Meridian, Mississippi.

History
Broadcasters and Publishers, Inc., received the construction permit for a new FM radio station in Meridian. When WDAL-FM hit the air in February 1968, it was the 24-hour counterpart to 1330 WDAL, simulcasting its country format during the day and airing contemporary music at night. The -FM suffix was dropped in 1976, and the station became WJDQ for the first time in 1979 and flipped to a Top 40/CHR station as "Q101". The station remained as a CHR format throughout the next three-and-a-half decades.

In 2006, WJDQ dropped its CHR format and became WMSO as "Miss 101" with a country format. On September 9, 2011, WMSO dropped its country format, flipped back to CHR, and returned back to its "Q101" branding. On October 7, 2011, WMSO changed their call letters back to WJDQ, which had previously been on the 95.1 frequency (now WJXM) in the intervening five years.

References

External links

JDQ
Contemporary hit radio stations in the United States